Tricheurymerus is a genus of beetles in the family Cerambycidae, containing the following species:

 Tricheurymerus obscurus (Prosen, 1947)
 Tricheurymerus quadristigma (Gounelle, 1909)

References

Ectenessini